{{Automatic taxobox
 | name          = Coniophanes
 | image         = Coniophanes fissidens.jpg
 | image_caption = Coniophanes fissidens
 | taxon         = Coniophanes
 | authority     = Hallowell, 1860
 | synonyms      = Dromicus, Erythrolamprus, Glaphyrophis, Homalopsis, Hydrops, Rhadinaea, Tachymenis, Taeniophis
 | synonyms_ref  = 
}}Coniophanes is a genus of colubrid snakes, commonly referred to as black-striped snakes, but they also have many other common names. The genus consists of 17 species, and despite the common name, not all of them display striping.

Geographic range

Species of Coniophanes are found primarily in Mexico and Central America, but range as far north as southern Texas in the United States, and as far south as Peru in South America.

Description
Some of the species, such as C. alvarezi, are solid brown.

Habitat and behaviorConiophanes snakes are secretive burrowers. They spend most of their time digging into loose soils, forest leaf litter, or under rotting cactus. They are nocturnal, emerging from their underground retreats in the late evening to feed on frogs, lizards, small rodents, and smaller snakes.

Reproduction
Species in the genus Coniophanes are oviparous, laying clutches of up to 10 eggs in loose soil. The eggs hatch in around 40 days, depending on relative temperature and humidity.

Species
The following 17 species are recognized as being valid.C. alvarezi  – Chiapan stripeless snake – MexicoC. andresensis  – Isla San Andrés snake – Isla San Andrés, ColombiaC. bipunctatus  – two-spotted snake – Mexico, Guatemala, Honduras, Belize, Nicaragua, Panama, El Salvador, and Costa RicaC. b. bipunctatus C. b. biseriatus  C. dromiciformis  – Peters' running snake – Ecuador and PeruC. fissidens  – yellowbelly snake – Mexico, Belize, Guatemala, Honduras, El Salvador, Nicaragua, Costa Rica, Panama, Ecuador, Peru, and ColombiaC. f. convergens C. f. dispersus C. f. fissidens C. f. proterops C. f. punctigularis C. imperialis  – black-striped snake – United States (Texas), Mexico, Belize, Guatemala, and HondurasC. i. imperialis C. i. clavatus C. i. copei C. joanae  – PanamaC. lateritius  – stripeless snake – Mexico C. longinquus  – Ecuador, PeruC. melanocephalus  – MexicoC. meridanus  – peninsula stripeless snake – Mexico C. michoacanensis  – Mexico C. piceivittis  – Cope's black-striped snake – Mexico, Belize, Honduras, El Salvador, Nicaragua, and Costa RicaC. p. frangivirgatus C. p. piceivittis C. quinquevittatus  – five-striped snake – Mexico and GuatemalaC. schmidti  – faded black-striped snake – Mexico, Belize, and Guatemala.C. taeniata  – Cope's black-striped snake  – Mexico C. taylori  – Mexico Nota bene: A binomial authority or trinomial authority in parentheses indicates that the species or subspecies was originally described in a genus other than Coniophanes.

References

Further reading
Freiberg M (1982). Snakes of South America. Hong Kong: T.F.H. Publications. 189 pp. . (Genus Coniophanes, p. 93).
Hallowell E (1860). 'In: Cope ED (1860). "Catalogue of the Colubridæ in the Museum of the Academy of Natural Sciences of Philadelphia, with notes and descriptions of new species. Part 2". Proc. Acad. Nat. Sci. Philadelphia 12': 241-266. (Coniophanes'', new genus, p. 248).

External links
Herps of Texas: Coniophanes imperialis

Coniophanes
Taxa named by Edward Hallowell (herpetologist)
Snake genera